Husein "Tutek" Jašarević (1914–1979) was among the first players of FK Borac from Banja Luka, Bosnia and Herzegovina, former Yugoslavia.

Club career
He played for the FK Borac before the Second World War, and a couple seasons after 1945. He finished his career in 1947. His position was defensive midfielder.

External links
  Photo of Jasarevic with his teammates (FK Borac team from 1935) and more information about the FK Borac.

1914 births
1979 deaths
Sportspeople from Banja Luka
Bosnia and Herzegovina footballers
Yugoslav footballers
Association football midfielders
FK Borac Banja Luka players